Teen Bahuraniyan is a 1968 Indian Hindi-language comedy film directed by S. S. Vasan and S. S. Balan. It is a remake of 1967 Tamil film Bama Vijayam. Sowcar Janaki, Kanchana and Jayanthi star as the female leads, reprising their roles from the original film.

Music 
The film score is composed by the musical duo Kalyanji-Anandji, while the lyrics were written by Anand Bakshi.

Cast 

Prithviraj Kapoor as Dinanath
Agha as Shankar
Showkar Janaki as Parvati
Ramesh Deo as Ram
Kanchana as Seeta
Rajendranath as Kanhaiya
Jayanthi as Radha
Dhumal as Hari Prasad 
Kanhaiyalal as Seeta's Father
Lalita Pawar as Seeta's Mother
Niranjan Sharma as Parvati's Father
Shashikala as Sheela 
Jagdeep as Mahesh 
Baby Farida as Parvati's Daughter
Madhumati as Mala

References

External links 
 

1968 films
1968 comedy films
Films directed by S. S. Vasan
Films scored by Kalyanji Anandji
Films with screenplays by K. Balachander
Gemini Studios films
1960s Hindi-language films
Hindi remakes of Tamil films